Tear Yo Club Down is a 1999 album by Memphis underground rapper Gangsta Pat that was recorded in response to comments made by Three 6 Mafia in The Source magazine referring to him as "a fake ass rapper with no skills." Though many considered Pat's retaliation a desperate attempt for publicity, the album is still considered one of his best works. This album is also considered the door opener for many other disses to Three 6 by unknown rappers or other former members, the most known being Atlanta rapper, T-Rock and his tracks, "My Little Arm" & "Fuck 3 6".

Track listing 
 Smoke Somethin' - 3:58
 All They Wanna - 4:20
 I Let'em Know - 4:00
 Nigga's I Hang Wit - 4:00
 We Buck up N Dis - 4:07
 G'N 4 Life - 4:23
 Interview One - 1:02
 Gangsta Party - 4:02
 My Gator's - 4:01
 It's Friday Night - 4:01
 It's All Good - 3:58
 I Need Your Money - 4:14
 Tear Yo Club Down (Three 6 Mafia Diss) - 4:30
 Interview Two - 1:06

References

1999 albums
Gangsta Pat albums